Fındık is a town (belde) and municipality in the Güçlükonak District of Şırnak Province in Turkey. The settlement is populated by Kurds of the Harunan and Jilyan tribes and had a population of 2,147 in 2021.

The settlement of Gümüşyazı is attached to Fındık.

References 

Populated places in Şırnak Province
Towns in Turkey
Kurdish settlements in Şırnak Province